Kemora is a racing circuit situated in Central Ostrobothnia, Veteli municipality of Finland. The track was built in 1983 and was lengthened in 1987. In the same area is also a kart racing track and a snowmobile track used in winter.

External links 
Kemora
Veteli UA

Motorsport venues in Finland